Clifford Webb RBA 1936, RE 1948 (14 March 1894 – 29 July 1972) was an English artist, illustrator and writer. He specialised in animal drawings.

He was apprenticed as a lithographer, but served in the British Army (Wiltshire Regiment) during World War I and then studied at the Westminster School of Art. He fought at Mons, Gallipoli and in Mesopotamia. He was wounded four times, the most serious of which was a shot to the left side of his jaw, and mentioned in despatches. From 1917 to 1919, he served as a captain in the Indian Army.

From 1919 to 1922, he studied at the Westminster School of Art under Walter Bayes and Bernard Meninsky and then from 1923 to 1926 he was a part-time lecturer at Central School of Art in Birmingham. His remaining family still reside centrally in the UK and the United States.

Webb produced illustrations for the first two books of the Swallows and Amazons series by Arthur Ransome, which were used in some 1930s editions. Because Ransome did not like those produced by Steven Spurrier for the first book, Swallows and Amazons, those were not used in its first edition (1930), apart from the endpaper map and dust jacket. In 1931 the second edition contained Webb's illustrations, as did the first edition of the sequel, Swallowdale. (Ransome himself was the original illustrator of the third story, Peter Duck, and all that followed. Further, in 1938 he produced illustrations for Swallows and Amazons and Swallowdale, replacing Webb's drawings.)

Issue 67 of The Imaginative Book Illustration Society's Studies in Illustration contains a short biography & full bibliography by Martin Steenson.

Books

As writer 
Webb both wrote and illustrated these children's books
The Story of Noah
The Thirteenth Pig 1965
Butterwick Farm 1933
Animals from Everywhere 1938
More Animals from Everywhere 1959
The Story of Noah 1931
A Jungle Picnic 1934
The North Pole Before Lunch 1936
 Magic Island (1956)
The Friendly Place 1962
Strange Creatures 1963
All Kinds of Animals 1970

As illustrator 
Written by Ella Monckton, his wife: 
For the Moon
The Little Clown
Dog Toby
The Boy and the Mountain
The Top of the Mountain
The Gates Family
The Go-To-Bed Book 1935

By other writers: 
Swallow and Amazons: Arthur Ransome, 1930
Swallowdale : Arthur Ransome, 1931
An Introduction to India : E. Lucia Turnbull 1933
A Key to the Countryside : Marcus Woodward 1934
A Surgeon's China : Albert Gervais 1934
Words Beasts and Fishes : Marmaduke Dixey 1936
The Hill Fox : Ernest Blakeman Vesey 1937
Under the Chesnut Tree : Ida Gandy 1938
Creatures Great and Small: Theodora Horton 1938
The Gentle Art of Walking : Geoffrey Murray, 1939
The Pig who was too thin : Margaret Alleyne 1946
The Enchanted Glen : Beatrice Carroll 1947
Moss Green Days : Ralph Wightman 1952

References

 Who Was Who, 1971–1980 (London: A & C Black, 1982)

External links

 

1890s births
1972 deaths
Alumni of the Westminster School of Art
British Army personnel of World War I
English children's writers
English engravers
English illustrators
English wood engravers
20th-century engravers